An IC extractor is a tool for safely and quickly removing integrated circuits (ICs) from their sockets. The main purpose of using this tool is to avoid bending the socket pins and to avoid damage through electrostatic discharge (ESD).

References

Electronics work tools